ТV ONE HD is a Bosnian local commercial Cable television channel based in Kozarac, Prijedor, Bosnia and Herzegovina. The program is mainly produced in HD in Bosnian language.

See also 
 ONE HD TV

References

External links 
 TV ONE Kozarac in Facebook

Television stations in Bosnia and Herzegovina
Television channels and stations established in 2018
Companies of Bosnia and Herzegovina